Götterdämmerung (German for "Twilight of the Gods") is the seventh album by German industrial metal band Megaherz, released on 20 January 2012. It is the first album by the band to feature Christoph Klinke on guitars.

Track listing

Charts

References

2012 albums
Megaherz albums